Turritopsis nutricula is a small hydrozoan that once reaching adulthood, can transfer its cells back to childhood. This adaptive trait likely evolved in order to extend the life of the individual. Several different species of the genus Turritopsis were formerly classified as T. nutricula, including the "immortal jellyfish" which is now classified as T. dohrnii.

Life cycle 
Hydrozoans have two distinct stages in their life, a polyp stage and a medusa stage.  The polyp stage is benthic, with the cells forming colonies, while the medusa stage is a singular, planktonic organism. Generally in hydrozoa the medusa develops from the asexual budding of the polyp and the polyp results from sexual reproduction of medusae.   In T. nutricula, planktonic medusa have the capability to bud polyps or medusae which also have the ability to spawn new medusae.  Several nominal species have been described for this genus, but most of them had been synonymized and attributed to one cosmopolitan species, Turritopsis nutricula.

Reversing the life cycle 
Turritopsis nutricula in any point of the medusa stage has the ability to transform back into its polyp stage. T. nutricula is the first known metazoan that has been observed to sexually mature and return to its juvenile colonial stage. This regression from medusa to polyp has only been observed with the presence of differentiated cells from the outer umbrella and part of the animals digestion system.  The ability of transdifferentiation, a non-stem cell which can morph into a different type of cell, in these cells is pivotal for this species' changing life cycle.  It is unknown whether or not stem cells play a role in this process. Due to this regular transformation by T. nutricula, it is thought to have an indefinite lifespan.

There are four stages that were found to describe the inverted life cycle of the Turritopsis nutricula: healthy medusa (where the T.nutricula would swim actively), unhealthy medusa (the T. nutricula was not able to swim), four-leaf clover, and cyst (would produce the polyp morphologically).

References

External links 

Oceaniidae
Animals described in 1857
Immortality